Gilbert Ashton MC (27 September 1896 – 6 February 1981) was an English cricketer who played 62 first-class matches between the wars, mostly for Cambridge University (whom he captained in 1921, and also captained at football) and Worcestershire. His obituary in Wisden called him "a fine, aggressive stroke-player" and praised his fielding ability at cover point.
His bowling was of the occasional variety, and after he left Cambridge became essentially non-existent.

Career 
Ashton played less cricket than his ability merited as his "day job" for four decades from 1921 until 1961
was that of headmaster of the prep school of Abberley Hall School near Worcester. However, he played for Worcestershire when he could during the holidays, and in 1922, on only his second appearance for the county, he made 125 (his career-best) and 84 in a match against Northamptonshire at New Road.
Wisden'''s obituary also praised his 36 for an England XI against Warwick Armstrong's Australians a year earlier, which gave the English hope after having been dismissed for 43 in the first innings, and helped lay the ground for a fine victory.

After 1927, Ashton ceased to play even semi-regular county cricket, and indeed after that year he was to make only two more first-class appearances: against Northamptonshire in June 1934 and, finally, against Leicestershire in July 1936. He did very little in either game.
He did, however, play a minor single-innings game for his county against the Royal Air Force aged 47 in 1944; he was lbw for nought.

Before going up to Trinity College, Cambridge, Ashton had been captain of the Winchester College XI. Upon leaving the school, he served in the First World War in the Royal Field Artillery; it was at this time that he won his MC "for conspicuous gallantry in action. He
repeatedly repaired his telephone line under a very heavy fire, and maintained communication with his Battery all day." He also lost his left thumb during the war, although this was said not to have affected the quality of his fielding in later years.
After retiring from playing, Ashton served as a magistrate, and was also President of Worcestershire County Cricket Club from 1967 to 1969. He was appointed a Deputy Lieutenant of Worcestershire in 1968.

Family
Ashton's mother, Victoria Alexandrina Inglis, was the daughter of Sir John Eardley Wilmot Inglis, who commanded the British forces at the Siege of Lucknow, and Julia Selina Thesiger.

A number of his relatives played first-class cricket: his brothers Claude and Hubert had substantial careers for Cambridge and Essex, while another brother, Percy, had one game for Essex. Two uncles, Alfred Inglis and John Inglis reached first-class level briefly in the 1880s. Finally, Ashton's brother-in-law Ralph Huband played twice for Cambridge in 1923.

 Notes 

 References 
 ASHTON, Gilbert, Who Was Who'', A & C Black, 1920–2016  (online edition, Oxford University Press, 2014)
 Gilbert Ashton from CricketArchive
 

English cricketers
Worcestershire cricketers
Cambridge University cricketers
Free Foresters cricketers
Recipients of the Military Cross
1896 births
1981 deaths
British Army personnel of World War I
Royal Field Artillery officers
People educated at Winchester College
Alumni of Trinity College, Cambridge
Deputy Lieutenants of Worcestershire
Corinthian F.C. players
Association footballers not categorized by position
Demobilised Officers cricketers
English footballers